Beckingham is a village and civil parish in the Bassetlaw district of Nottinghamshire, England, about 3 miles west of Gainsborough, Lincolnshire. According to the 2001 census it had a population of 1,168, reducing to 1,098 at the 2011 Census.

History
The parish church of All Saints is mostly of the 13th century, though the exterior is apparently 15th century. The west tower has buttresses, battlements, gargoyles and pinnacles. There is a north chancel chapel and sedilia. It is a Grade II* listed building.

A tower windmill was built some time prior to 1840 to the north of the village. The tower was straight-sided. In 1841 the mill had 2 pairs of millstones driven by 4 common sails, described as "self-regulating cloth and rollers to the sails". By 1850 the mill had been fitted with a pair of patent sails, retaining one pair of rollers; these drove 3 pairs of millstones.

Beckingham Marshes
Beckingham Marshes is a RSPB nature reserve. Nearby there is a crude oil and gas production field run by IGas Energy. The wells in the field were fracked using the older less controversial technique.

See also
 Listed buildings in Beckingham, Nottinghamshire
 East Midlands Oil Province

References

External links

 Beckingham Village

Villages in Nottinghamshire
Civil parishes in Nottinghamshire
Bassetlaw District